James Stewart (born 21 October 1975) is an Australian stage, television and film actor, best known for his appearances in the television series Breakers and Packed to the Rafters. He has also made an appearance in the popular Australian drama Sea Patrol. From 2016, he began starring in Home and Away as Justin Morgan.

Early life
Stewart was born on 21 October 1975 in Melbourne. He grew up on the Gold Coast, alongside his identical twin brother Nicholas and older half-sister Annie. His mother Beverly raised him and his three siblings as a single parent while studying to become a teacher. She eventually graduated with honours in English and literature at Monash University. His estranged father Arthur Koo is a former Australian soldier who served in the Vietnam War. Stewart has Scottish and Chinese ancestry through his parents. In 1996, Stewart joined the band george alongside his brother Nicholas, Tyrone Noonan and his then-housemate, Katie Noonan. He would later leave the band to pursue a career in acting full-time.

Career
In 2007, Stewart played Jim O'Connor in the Queensland Theatre Company's production of The Glass Menagerie. He won the 2008 Matilda Award for Best Supporting Actor and was nominated for the Helpmann Award for Best Male Actor in a Supporting Role in a Play.

In 2010, Stewart received a Logie award nomination for Most Popular New Male Talent for his role as Jake Barton in Packed to the Rafters.

In 2015, Stewart starred in the ABC-TV drama series Hiding alongside fellow Aussie stars Jacqueline McKenzie and Kate Jenkinson.  The show centres around a family that is forced to go into the federal witness protection program and relocates to another city when the father (Stewart) is arrested after a failed drug deal.

In 2016, Stewart joined Home and Away as Justin Morgan during the show's twenty-ninth season.

Personal life
He was engaged to co-star Jessica Marais, until they separated in 2015. Stewart and Marais have a daughter together, born May 2012. Stewart was in a relationship with his former Home and Away co-star Isabella Giovinazzo. 

Stewart has been in a relationship with his Home and Away co-star, Sarah Roberts since October 2017. They announced their engagement in December 2018, and married at Luttrellstown Castle in Ireland in July 2019.

Filmography

References

External links 

1975 births
20th-century Australian male actors
21st-century Australian male actors
Australian male film actors
Australian male stage actors
Australian male television actors
Living people